UB-14 may refer to:
SM UB-14 a German World War I submarine
Burnelli UB-14, a 1930s American prototype propeller aircraft